Carabus catenulatus is a species of beetle endemic to Europe, where it is observed in Bosnia and Herzegovina, mainland Italy, Croatia, Slovenia, and Switzerland.

References

External links

catenulatus
Beetles of Europe
Beetles described in 1763
Taxa named by Giovanni Antonio Scopoli